For the majority of cities in North America, the most recent official population census results, estimates or short-term projections date to 2015. This list compiles figures for all North American cities with a population within city limits exceeding 500,000 that year. These figures do not reflect the population of the urban agglomeration or metropolitan area, which typically does not coincide with the administrative boundaries of the city. They refer to mid-2015 populations with the following exceptions:

 Mexican cities, whose figures derive from the 2015 Intercensal Survey conducted by INEGI with a reference date of 15 March 2015;
 Calgary, whose 2015 municipal census had a reference date of April 1;
 Edmonton, which conducted municipal censuses in April 2014 and April 2016 but has not reported an intercensal estimate of its 2015 population. The April 2016 census result is given instead.

List

See also
List of North American metropolitan areas by population
List of the largest urban agglomerations in North America
List of cities in Canada
List of cities in Mexico
List of the largest municipalities in Canada by population
List of United States cities by population

Explanatory notes

References 

Lists of cities by population
Lists of cities in the Americas
Cities